Watt is a surname of Scottish and English origin. It is thought to originate from an extremely common Middle English personal name, Wat(t), a short form of Walter. Notable people with the surname include:

Adam Watt, Australian boxer
Alan Watt (diplomat) (1901–1988), Australian diplomat
Alexander Watt, British plant ecologist
Allan Watt, Scottish sprinter
Andrew Watt (record producer) (born 1990), American record producer, singer
Ben Watt, British musician and music producer
Chris Watt, American football player
Davey Watt, Australian speedway rider
David Watt (computer scientist), British computer scientist
Derek Watt, American football player
Douglas Watt (politician), Canadian politician
Eddie Watt, Major League Baseball pitcher
Fiona Watt (author), British children's author
Francis Watt (disambiguation), various people
Geoff Watt, Australian runner
George Watt (disambiguation), multiple people
Hamish Watt, Scottish politician
Ian Watt, literary historian
James Watt, Scottish engineer, for whom is named the watt, the SI-derived unit of power
James Watt Jr., English manufacturer, son of James
James G. Watt, US Secretary of the Interior
Jim Watt (boxer), Scottish boxer
Joachim von Watt (1484–1551), birth name of Swiss scholar Joachim Vadian
John Brown Watt, Australian politician
Jonathan Watt, English cricketer
Joseph Watt, Scottish VC recipient
Joseph M. Watt, American judge
J. J. Watt, American football player
Katherine Christie Watt, Scottish nurse and civil servant
Kathy Watt, Australian cyclist
Leslie Watt, New Zealand cricketer
Mel Watt, American politician
Michael Watt (disambiguation), multiple people
Mike Watt, American musician
Mike Watt (disambiguation), multiple people
Mitchell Watt, Australian track and field athlete
Mitchell Watt (basketball), American basketball player
Nicole Watt, Canadian skater
Phil Watt, English footballer
Richard Harding Watt, designer of buildings in Knutsford, Cheshire
Robert Watt, Canadian herald
Sanchez Watt, English footballer
Sarah Watt (1958–2011), Australian film director
Steven Watt (footballer), footballer
T. J. Watt, American football player
Tom Watt (ice hockey), Canadian hockey coach
Tom Watt (actor), British actor, journalist and radio DJ
Tommy Watt (1925–2006), Scottish bandleader
Tony Watt, Scottish footballer
William Watt (disambiguation), multiple people

See also
Watt (disambiguation)
Watts (surname)

English-language surnames
Surnames from given names